The Bangladesh national under-23 cricket team in March 2004 played a first-class match against Zimbabwe A at the Fatullah Osmani Stadium, losing to Zimbabwe by 223 runs. The team has since played four matches in 2013, two of them having List A status.

See also
 Bangladesh A cricket team
 Bangladesh national under-19 cricket team
 List of Bangladesh under-23 international cricketers

References

A
Under-23 cricket teams
National sports teams of Bangladesh